Renzo G. Fenci (1914–1999) was an Italian-American artist and arts educator, best known for his bronze sculpture. He worked in 1942 as a New Deal artist with the United States Treasury Department's Section of Painting and Sculpture.

Biography 
Fenci was born in Florence, Italy on 18 November 1914. At a young age he went to study art at the Royal Institute of Art. He received a master's degree in 1932 from Instituto d'Arte Firenze (Art Institute of Florence) and studied with sculptors Libero Andriotti and Bruno Innocenti.

He emigrated to New York City, New York around 1937 or 1938, due to the change in politics in Europe and the rise in Fascism. Fenci lived in New York City, New York and Madison, Wisconsin before settling down in Pullman, Washington in order to teach fine art at Washington State College.

He was commissioned in 1942 by the United States Treasury Department's Section of Painting and Sculpture (later known as The Section of Fine Arts) to create art. These commissions were for the creation of a series of terra-cotta bas reliefs for a post office in Easley, South Carolina, entitled “Cultivation of Corn”. Originally he planned to create six bas-relief panels, but the Section of Painting and Sculpture would only pay for three panels and there was much difficulty in the completion of this job.

By 1944, Fenci moved to Santa Barbara, California. Between 1947 until 1954, he was taught at Santa Barbara College (now called University of California, Santa Barbara). From 1955 until 1977, Fenci was the head of the sculpture department at Otis Art Institute (now named Otis College of Art and Design).

Fenci has work in the many public art museum collections including at the Uffizi museum, and the Smithsonian American Art Museum.

Fenci died at the age of 85 in Los Angeles, California on December 31, 1999.

Personal life 
He was married to Jeanne Lyons Foster in Santa Barbara. Fenci had one son and two stepdaughters, his son is also a sculptor.

See also 

 List of New Deal sculpture

References

External links 

 
Interview with Renzo Fenci, the Dialogues in art television series (episode 10)

1914 births
1999 deaths
Otis College of Art and Design faculty
University of California, Santa Barbara faculty
Artists from Florence
Artists from Los Angeles
Italian emigrants to the United States